Barrow Airport may refer to:

 Barrow/Walney Island Airport in Barrow-in-Furness, England, United Kingdom
 Wiley Post–Will Rogers Memorial Airport in Utqiaġvik (formerly known as Barrow), Alaska, United States
 Barrow Island Airport in Western Australia